Herbert Marsh Sims (15 March 1853 – 5 October 1885) was an English amateur first-class cricketer, who played eighteen matches for Cambridge University from 1873 to 1875, and five  games for Yorkshire County Cricket Club from 1875 to 1877.

Born in Mount Tavy, Tavistock, Devon, Sims was educated at St Peter's School, York, and Jesus College, Cambridge. At cricket he was a right-arm fast bowler. He took 65 wickets at 19.42, with a best of 6 for 76 against the Gentlemen of England.  He took five wickets in an innings three times in all, the other occasions being against Surrey and the Marylebone Cricket Club (MCC).  All his bowling was for Cambridge University.  He scored 484 runs at 15.12, with a highest score of 71 for Cambridge University against Surrey.  He took eighteen catches in the field.

After graduating from Cambridge, Sims became a Church of England priest and was curate at St Peter's Church, Hunslet (a suburb of Leeds, Yorkshire) 1878–84. He was then appointed curate at St Cuthbert's, Hunslet, but died in October 1885 in Whitby, Yorkshire, aged 32.

References

External links
Cricinfo Profile
Cricket Archive Statistics

1853 births
1885 deaths
Sportspeople from Tavistock
Yorkshire cricketers
English cricketers
Cambridge University cricketers
People educated at St Peter's School, York
Alumni of Jesus College, Cambridge
19th-century English Anglican priests